Goalpara,) is the district headquarters of Goalpara district, Assam, India.

Etymology
The name Goalpara is said to have originated from the word "Gwaltippika" meaning Guwali village, or The village of the milk men  (Yadav). In local dialect, "para" means village.

Geography
Goalpara is located on the bank of the river Brahmaputra. It has an average elevation of 35 metres (114 feet).

Goalpara is endowed with scenic beauty. Hulukanda Hill, located at the heart of Goalpara on the bank of the Brahmaputra river, is one of the natural scenic views in the town, with various kinds of waterfowl and monkeys. There are some other bodies of water such as Hashila beel, Kumri beel, and Urpad Beel. The Urpad Beel becomes the centre of migratory birds during Oct-March. The evergreen forests on low hills create an undulating landscape.

Goalpara district consists of 8 blocks:
Balijana
Jaleswar
Kharmuza
Krishnai
Kuchdhowa
Lakhipur
Matia
Rangjuli

Demographics

As of 2011 Indian Census, Goalpara had a total population of 53,430, of which 26,970 were males and 26,460 were females. Population within the age group of 0 to 6 years was 6,125. The total number of literates in Goalpara was 39,627 which constituted 74.2% of the population with male literacy of 77.1% and female literacy of 71.2%. The effective literacy rate of 7+ population of Goalpara was 83.8%, of which male literacy rate was 87.3% and female literacy rate was 80.2%. The Scheduled Castes and Scheduled Tribes population was 6,158 and 1,702 respectively. Goalpara had 11,617 households in 2011.

Religion

The largest religious group in the town are Muslims constituting 53.65% of the population. Hindus make up 44.99% and 1.36% are others.

Languages

Assamese is the official language of the district and is spoken by 77.9% of the population, while Bengali is spoken by 16.8% and Hindi spoken by 3.6%, as per 2011 census. The Goalpariya is the most commonly spoken dialect of Assamese in the town.

Education

Some of the major educational institutions are:

Schools
 Sainik School, Goalpara
 Jawahar Navodaya Vidyalaya, Goalpara

Colleges
 Goalpara College, Goalpara
 Dudhnoi College,Dudhnoi,Goalpara
 Bikali College, Dhupdhara, Goalpara

Politics
Goalpara district consists of four assembly constituencies which are Goalpara East, Goalpara West, Jaleshwar and Dudhnoi. The first three are part of Dhubri (Lok Sabha constituency).
Following are the present MLA's of Goalpara-
Goalpara East: AK Rasheed Alam (INC)
Goalpara West: Abdur Rashid Mondal (INC)
Jaleswar     : Aftabuddin (INC)
Dudhnoi      : Jadav Swargiary (INC)(SC)

Notable people

 Abbas Uddin Ahmed, singer
 Ashraful Haque, Bollywood actor
 Adil Hussain, actor and theatre personality
 Baharul Islam, actor and theatre personality
 Birubala Rabha, Indian activist who campaigns against witchcraft and witch hunting
 Bhakti Ballabh Tirtha, spiritual master
 Jugal Kishore Choudhury, modernist architect

References

 
Cities and towns in Goalpara district
Dudhnoicollege.ac.in